Allison Ponthier is an American indie folk singer and songwriter. Her debut EP Faking My Own Death was released in 2021, and her second EP Shaking Hands With Elvis was released in 2022.

Early life and education
Ponthier was born and raised in the town of Allen, a suburb of Dallas, Texas, and studied jazz at the University of North Texas before moving to Brooklyn, New York in 2017 at age 20. In New York, she worked for the Museum of Natural History Snapchat stories program, tried modeling, sold jewelry she made, and drew commissioned pet portraits.

In 2019, Ponthier began posting to TikTok, with her work including song covers, songs adapted with what Billboard describes as "queer-themed lyrics", stop motion animation, and duets. She was signed to Interscope Records in 2020.

Career
In August 2021, Ponthier released her debut EP Faking My Own Death. The debut single from the EP, "Cowboy", was named one of the "25 Best Songs By LGBTQ Artists of 2021 (So Far)" by Billboard on June 29, 2021.

Ponthier wrote "Cowboy" in 2017 after moving to New York, but delayed its release, explaining to The Guardian in 2021, "because I was a little teen hipster rebel I was like: 'I don’t need country music, I don’t want to make that.' But I was so wrong, because it was an amazing way to express myself." She told American Songwriter she wrote "Cowboy" after she met her girlfriend and while she was processing what she described as the "culture shock" of her move to New York and her need to come out about her sexual orientation, and told Atwood Magazine, "I guess it was time to live my truth as a gay cowboy." For the "Cowboy" video, Ponthier has cited Death Becomes Her, The Witches, and Troll 2 as some of the many films that served as inspiration for her work with director Jordan Bahat on the creative direction of the video.

The second single released from the EP was "Harshest Critic" in May 2021, which she co-wrote with Adam Melchor. Ponthier wrote the song "Hell is a Crowded Room" with Rick Nowels, and in a review of the song for NPR Music, Ann Powers writes, "Ponthier invokes Chris Isaak invoking Roy Orbison, Cat Power invoking Peggy Lee, Lana Del Rey invoking every singer David Lynch ever ushered onto the stage of Twin Peaks'''s Bang Bang Bar."

She is also a featured vocalist on the track "I Lied" on Lord Huron's 2021 Long Lost album, performed with Lord Huron on The Tonight Show Starring Jimmy Fallon in May 2021, and toured with Lord Huron in September 2021. Following the tour, she performed at Texas's Austin City Limits Music Festival.

In January of 2022 Jack Antonoff announced that Ponthier would be joining him for Bleachers' 2022 tour.

In June 2022, Ponthier released her second EP Shaking Hands With Elvis. According to Billboard'', "Half the songs on the 6-track project sound like sonic cousins of her previous work [...] But the other half of the songs, including standout single “Autopilot” and the high-camp fantasy “Hollywood Forever Cemetery,” sees the singer getting more experimental and dreamy with her sound".

References

External links
 Official website

Year of birth missing (living people)
Living people
People from Dallas County, Texas
Indie folk musicians
American women singer-songwriters
American LGBT singers
American LGBT songwriters
21st-century American women singers
American TikTokers
Interscope Records artists
LGBT people from Texas
21st-century LGBT people